John Dampier (1750 – 18 August 1826) was an English amateur cricketer in the late 18th century. His place of birth is unknown but he was educated at Eton College. He died in Ely, Cambridgeshire when he was either 75 or 76 years old. He made five known appearances for the White Conduit Club team, based at White Conduit Fields in Islington, between 1785 and 1787. He was an early member of Marylebone Cricket Club (MCC) which was founded in 1787, but he is not known to have played for MCC.

References

1750 births
1826 deaths
English cricketers
English cricketers of 1701 to 1786
English cricketers of 1787 to 1825
White Conduit Club cricketers
People educated at Eton College